The Light middleweight competition at the 2022 IBA Women's World Boxing Championships was held from 9 to 19 May 2022.

Results

Finals

Top half

Section 1

Section 2

Bottom half

Section 3

Section 4

References

External links
Draw

Light middleweight